The Diving Competition for men and women at the 1951 Pan American Games was held from February 25 to March 3, 1951, in Buenos Aires, Argentina. There were two events, for both men and women.

Men's competition

3m Springboard

10m Platform

Women's competition

3m Springboard

10m Platform

Medal table

See also
 Diving at the 1952 Summer Olympics

References

Buenos Aires 1951
 

 
  .

1951
Diving
Pan American Games
1951 Pan American Games